The Commonwealth Final was a Motorcycle speedway Final sanctioned by the FIM as a qualifying round for the Speedway World Championship between 1979 and 1994.

Introduced to the World Championship in 1979, it served as a qualifying round for Commonwealth riders, primarily those from Australia, England and New Zealand.

The Commonwealth Final was not run from 1981-1985, during which time riders who qualified through their national championship were through to the Overseas Final. It returned to the World Championship calendar in 1986 and lasted until 1994, the last year of the traditional single meeting World Championship Final before the advent of the Speedway Grand Prix World championship series in 1995.

Editions
All 11 Commonwealth Finals were held in England. Kelvin Tatum was the most successful Commonwealth Finalist, winning four finals (1987, 1988, 1990 and 1992). Reigning Australian Champion Leigh Adams was the only non-English winner when he took out the 1993 Final.

See also
 Speedway World Championship
 Speedway Grand Prix
 Motorcycle speedway

References